James Sharman Crawford (1812 – 28 April 1878) was the Member of Parliament for County Down, 1874–1878.`  He was a son of William Sharman Crawford who had unsuccessfully contested the constituency in 1852. He was also a member of a landed gentry family.

References

External links

UK MPs 1874–1880
1812 births
1878 deaths
Members of the Parliament of the United Kingdom for County Down constituencies (1801–1922)